Contest is a commune in the Mayenne department in north-western France.

The town is in the center of Lower Maine. Its village is 6 km south-west of Mayenne and 12 km north of Martigné-sur-Mayenne.

The name of the locality is attested in the form Constet in 1207. The place name honors the bishop of Bayeux of the sixth century, Contextus.

Notable Persons 
 Jacques Felix Jan de La Hamelinaye (1769-1861), general, retired to Contest at his retirement. 
 Bertrand Denis (1902 - 1986 in Contest), MP. 
 Louis Rouland (1907-1940), French aviator born in Contest. 
 Jean Yanne (1933-2003), actor, humorist, director. Born Roger-Jean Gouyé, from a family of clog makers who in the eighteenth century lived in the forest of Mayenne. His grandfather René-Jean Gouillet was born in Contest on March 13, 1789 and died in Fougères on October 11, 1855.

See also
Communes of the Mayenne department

References 

Communes of Mayenne